Alfonso Sacrati or Alphonse Sacrati (1585–1647) was a Roman Catholic prelate who served as Apostolic Nuncio to Switzerland (1646–1647), Vicegerent of Rome (1643–1646), and Bishop of Comacchio (1617–1626).

Biography
Alfonso Sacrati was born in 1585.
He is the brother of Cardinal Francesco Sacrati and nephew of Ercole Sacrati, Bishop of Comacchio.
On 12 June 1617, he was appointed during the papacy of Pope Paul V as Bishop of Comacchio.
On 10 September 1617, he was consecrated bishop by Giambattista Leni, Bishop of Ferrara, with Francesco Sacrati (cardinal), Titular Archbishop of Damascus, and Evangelista Tornioli, Bishop of Città di Castello, serving as co-consecrators.
In 1626, he resigned as Bishop of Comacchio.
On 27 March 1643, he was appointed during the papacy of Pope Urban VIII as Vicegerent of Rome; he resigned on 20 Oct 1646.
On 7 November 1646, he was appointed during the papacy of Pope Innocent X as Apostolic Nuncio to Switzerland.
He served as Apostolic Nuncio to Switzerland until his death on 14 September 1647.

Episcopal succession

References

External links and additional sources
 (for Chronology of Bishops) 
 (for Chronology of Bishops) 
 (for Chronology of Bishops) 
 (for Chronology of Bishops) 
 (for Chronology of Bishops) 

17th-century Italian Roman Catholic bishops
Bishops appointed by Pope Paul V
Bishops appointed by Pope Urban VIII
Bishops appointed by Pope Innocent X
1585 births
1647 deaths
People from Comacchio